The Beimen Island Presbyterian Church is a church in Beimen District, Tainan, Taiwan.

History
The church was originally established in September 1959 as part of the Beimen Mission. In May 1960, the church began accepting  patients. They distributed free clothing and groceries.

See also
 Christianity in Taiwan
 Taiwan Blackfoot Disease Socio-Medical Service Memorial House

References

1959 establishments in Taiwan
Churches in Tainan
Churches completed in 1959